The 1887 United States Senate election in New York was held from January 18 to 20, 1887, by the New York State Legislature to elect a U.S. Senator (Class 1) to represent the State of New York in the United States Senate. Incumbent Republican Senator Warner Miller was not renominated by the Republican legislative caucus and was succeeded by Frank Hiscock.

Background
Republican Warner Miller had been elected to this seat in a special election in 1881 to succeed Thomas C. Platt who had resigned. Miller's term would expire on March 3, 1887.

At the State election in November 1885, 20 Republicans and 12 Democrats were elected for a two-year term (1886-1887) in the State Senate. At the State election in November 1886, 74 Republicans and 54 Democrats were elected for the session of 1887 to the Assembly. The 110th New York State Legislature met from January 4 to May 26, 1887, at Albany, New York.

Republican caucus

Candidates
Frank Hiscock, U.S. Representative from Syracuse
Warner Miller, incumbent Senator since 1881
Levi P. Morton, former U.S. Minister to France (1881–85), U.S. Representative from New York City (1879–81), and candidate for Senate in 1885

Results
The caucus of Republican State legislators met on January 17, President pro tempore of the State Senate Edmund L. Pitts presided. 20 State senators and 71 assemblymen attended. Ex-Speaker of the Assembly George Z. Erwin (a Morton man) moved that a majority of all Republican legislators should be necessary to nominate, not only a majority of those present, meaning that 48 votes were required instead of 46, which was carried by a vote of 52 to 39. The incumbent U.S. Senator Warner Miller (Half-Breed faction) failed to be nominated by only four votes. Levi P. Morton (Stalwart faction) was rejected by the caucus, as in 1885. A small faction voted for Congressman Frank Hiscock. After the second ballot, Erwin moved to adjourn, which was carried by 48 to 43. The caucus met again on the next day, no choice was made in another two ballots. The caucus met again on January 19 after the joint ballot of the State Legislature, and after twelve more ballots, Erwin withdrew Morton's name and urged the Morton men to vote for Hiscock. On the next ballot Hiscock received one vote more than Miller (47 to 46), but was one short of the previously established majority of 48. On the 18th and last ballot, Hiscock received 50 votes and was nominated. On the next day, Hiscock was elected on the second joint ballot of the State Legislature. Thus, by blocking Miller's re-election, the Republican boss Thomas C. Platt took his revenge for his defeat at the special election in 1881.

Democratic caucus
The Democratic caucus nominated Smith Mead Weed (1834-1920), a lawyer and businessman of Plattsburgh, New York. Weed had been a member of the New York State Assembly from Clinton County, New York in 1865, 1866, 1867, 1871, 1873 and 1874; and a delegate to the 1876 and 1884 Democratic National Conventions.

General election

Aftermath
Hiscock served a single term, and remained in office until March 3, 1893. In January 1893, Hiscock was defeated for re-election by Democrat Edward Murphy, Jr.

See also 
 1886 and 1887 United States Senate elections

Notes

Sources
 
 

1887
New York
United States Senate